Ricardo Janaban Balarosa, Jr. (born June 24, 1980), known professionally as Wacky Kiray, is a Filipino stand-up comedian, host, and actor. He became known in the celebrity talent competition I Can Do That of ABS-CBN and was declared winner as "The Greatest Entertainer" in 2017. He also became one of the "sing-vestigators" of the Korean game show franchise I Can See Your Voice.

Career
Wacky Kiray started his career in stand-up comedy when he was discovered by the bar manager of former Raymund's Bar in Malate while he was singing as a guest of the said sing-along bar in 2000. He is currently a mainstay and resident stand-up comedian in Punchline and Laffline comedy bars.

He started working in ABS-CBN as an audience jester for the second season of Your Face Sounds Familiar in September 2015 and followed by different Kapamilya programs like Gandang Gabi Vice, Pinoy Boyband Superstar, The Voice Kids, Pilipinas Got Talent s5, etc.

Wacky Kiray's biggest break was when he became part of the hit celebrity talent show I Can Do That in 2017. He was named the winner of the said competition and was hailed as "The Greatest Entertainer" on June 4, 2017.

Personal life
He is the fourth of five children of Ricardo Balarosa, Sr. and Elizabeth Janaban.

Filmography

Television

Films

Guestings
 Chika, Besh! (2020)
 Banana Sundae (2017) 
 Umagang Kay Ganda (2017)
 Minute To Win It (2016, 2017) 
 Magandang Buhay (2017) 
 Family Feud (2016, 2017) 
 It’s Showtime (2015; Lip Swak daily winner, Lip Swak Olympics Grand Champion)

References

1980 births
Living people
Filipino male comedians
Filipino male film actors
Filipino LGBT actors
Filipino LGBT broadcasters
Filipino LGBT comedians
People from Pasay
ABS-CBN personalities
TV5 (Philippine TV network) personalities
Filipino male television actors
Filipino television variety show hosts